Nitrospinota is a bacterial phylum. Despite only few described species, members of this phylum are major nitrite-oxidizing bacteria in surface waters in oceans. By oxidation of nitrite to nitrate they are important in the process of nitrification in marine environments.

Although genus Nitrospina is aerobic bacterium, it was shown to oxidize nitrite also in oxygen minimum zone of the ocean. Depletion of oxygen in such zones leads to preference of anaerobic processes such as denitrification and nitrogen loss through anammox. Nitrospina thus outweight nitrogen loss by nitrification also in these oxygen depleted zones.

Among the cultivated isolates within the genus Nitrospina are Nitrospina gracilis and Nitrospina watsonii. Further genomes were resolved by culture-independent metagenome binning. The two Nitrospina species are, however, distantly related to environmentally abundant uncultured Nitrospinota. The two other strains were cultivated in 2020 each in the binary culture with alphaproteobacterial heterotroph. They are called "Candidatus Nitrohelix vancouverensis" and "Candidatus Nitronauta litoralis". "Nitrohelix vancouverensis" is closely related to uncultivated environmentally abundant Nitrospinota clades 1 and 2.

Taxonomy

The currently accepted taxonomy is based on the List of Prokaryotic names with Standing in Nomenclature (LPSN)  and National Center for Biotechnology Information (NCBI)

Phylum Nitrospinota Lücker et al. 2021
 Class "Nitrospinia" Lücker et al. 2013
 Order "Nitrospinales" Lücker et al. 2013
 Family Nitrospinaceae Garrity, Bell & Lilburn 2006
 Genus "Candidatus Nitrohelix" Mueller et al. 2021
 "Ca. N. vancouverensis" Mueller et al. 2021
 Genus "Candidatus Nitromaritima" Ngugi et al. 2016
 Genus "Candidatus Nitronauta" Mueller et al. 2021
 "Ca. N. litoralis" Mueller et al. 2021
 Genus Nitrospina Watson & Waterbury 1971
 N. gracilis Watson & Waterbury 1971
 "N. watsonii" Spieck et al. 2014

References 

Nitrogen cycle
Bacteria phyla
Bacteria